SM U-33 was a German Type U 31 U-boat of the Imperial German Navy.

Design
German Type U 31 submarines were double-hulled ocean-going craft similar to Type 23 and Type 27 boats in dimensions, differing only slightly in propulsion and speed. They were considered very good high sea boats with average manoeuvrability and good surface steering.

The U-boat was armed with four  torpedo tubes, two fitted in the bow and two in the stern, and carried six torpedoes. Additionally U-33 was equipped in 1915 with one  Uk L/30 deck gun, which was later replaced with a  gun. The boat's complement was four officers and 31 enlisted.

Service history

SS Brussels
On 28 March 1915, U-33 ordered the Great Eastern Railway's  to stop. Instead of doing so, her captain, Charles Fryatt, ordered full steam ahead and attempted to ram U-33, which only just managed to dive in time.

Sinking of hospital ship

On 30 March, 1916 the Russian hospital ship Portugal was towing a string of small flat-bottomed boats to ferry wounded from the shore to the ship. Off Rizeh, on the Turkish coast of the Black Sea she had stopped as one of the small boats was sinking and repairs were being made. The ship was not carrying wounded at the time, but had a staff of Red Cross workers on board, as well as her usual crew.
| The ship's crew saw a periscope approaching the vessel but as the ship was a hospital ship and protected by the Hague conventions no evasive actions were taken. Without warning SM U-33 fired a torpedo which missed. The submarine came around again fired a torpedo from a depth of 30 feet, which hit near the engine room, breaking the ship into two pieces. Of 273 persons on board, 158 were rescued.

Operations

SM U-33 Kptlt. Gausser until Autumn 1917, then to U-156; next C.O. probably Kptlt. Siess. Came off the stocks at Kiel about the end of November 1914, and joined the Kiel School for trials, proceeding to Emden on 12 January 1915. She was attached to the 4th Half Flotilla.

24–25 January 1915. On Bight patrol to an area where enemy battle cruisers were reported.

30 January 1915 ? Special anti-submarine patrol. Returned owing to engine trouble.

? 18–20 February 1915. Bight patrol.

21–22 February 1915. Bight patrol.

27 February – 10 April 1915. Through Channel to Atlantic. 2 S.S., 2 sailing vessels sunk.

29–30 May 1915. North Sea returned owing to defective W/T.

4–24 June 1915. Northabout to west coast of Scotland. Sank 2 S.S., 1 prize.

14–17 August 1915. Bight Anti-air raid patrol.

28 August – 15 September 1915. To Mediterranean northabout. Sank 5 S.S. Arrived Cattaro about 15 September and joined the Constantinople Half Flot.

28 September – 9 October 1915. Cruise in eastern Mediterranean. Sank 10 S.S.

16 November – 6 December 1915. Cruise in central Mediterranean. Sank 13 S.S. On 5 December was in action with drifter HOLLIBANK in the Straits of Otranto. Took prisoner Capt Wilson, King's messenger.

April 1916 – November 1916. U-33 was operating chiefly in the eastern Black Sea and was based on Constantinople or Varna. By April 1917 she was back in the Adriatic.

12 January – 10 February 1918. Left Cattaro and operated in eastern Mediterranean. Sank 2. S.S., 2 sailing vessels, and damaged but did not sink 2 S.S.

1–17 May 1918. Left Cattaro for the east, and on 7 May was in area off Port Said. Sank 1 S.S., 1 sailing vessel, and attacked 2 ships and a convoy unsuccessfully. On May 8 was in action, and on 15 May broke off undertaking owing to defects.

2 September to about 26 September. Left Cattaro for the east. Sank 1 S.S., 12 sailing vessels.

On 19 October 1918. U-33 left Cattaro for Kiel. The only incident of the voyage was that she was attacked by a trawler on 1 November in about 36°35'E. She steered northabout and by the Sound, at some time with UB-51 and UB-105.

Surrendered at Harwich January 16, 1919.

Summary of raiding history

See also 
Room 40

References

Notes

Citations

Bibliography

External links
Photos of cruises of German submarine U-54 in 1916-1918. Great photo quality, comments in German.
A 44 min. film from 1917 about a cruise of the German submarine U-35. A German propaganda film without dead or wounded; many details about submarine warfare in World War I.

Room 40:  original documents, photos and maps about World War I German submarine warfare and British Room 40 Intelligence from The National Archives, Kew, Richmond, UK.

German Type U 31 submarines
U-boats commissioned in 1914
World War I submarines of Germany
1914 ships
Ships built in Kiel